This is the order of battle during the Battle of Lepanto on 7 October 1571 in which the Holy League deployed 6 galleasses and 206 galleys, while the Ottoman forces numbered 216 galleys and 56 galliots.

Fleet of the Holy League¹
The combined Christian fleet was placed under the command of John of Austria (Don Juan de Austria) with Marcantonio Colonna as his principal deputy.

Left Wing
Commanded by Agostino Barbarigo (53 galleys, 2 galleasses)

 Venetian Galleasses (2)
 Galleass of Ambrogio Bragadin
 Galleass of Antonio Bragadin
 Venetian Galleys (39)
 Capitana Lanterna (flagship lantern) of Venice (L) – Agostino Barbarigo †, provveditore generale
 Capitana (flagship) of Venice (L) – Marco Querini, provveditore of the Fleet
 Fortuna (Fortune) of Venice – Andrea Barbarigo †
 Tre Mani (Three Hands) of Venice – Giorgio Barbarigo
 Due Delfini (Two Dolphins) of Candia – Francesco Zen
 Leone e Fenice (Lion & Phoenix) of Candia – Francesco Mengano
 Madonna (Milady) of Candia – Filippo Polani
 Cavallo Marino (Seahorse) of Candia – Antonio De Cavalli
 Due Leoni (Two Lions) of Candia – Nicolò Fradello
 Leone (Lion) of Candia – Francesco Bonvecchio
 Cristo (Christ) of Candia I – Andrea Corner
 Angelo (Angel) of Candia – Giovanni Angelo
 Piramide (Pyramid) of Candia – Francesco Bono †
 Cristo Risorto (Risen Christ) of Venice I – Simon Guoro
 Cristo Risorto (Risen Christ) of Venice II – Federico Renier
 Cristo (Christ) of Corfu – Cristoforo Condocolli
 Cristo Risorto (Risen Christ) of Candia I – Francesco Zancaruol
 Cristo (Christ) of Venice I – Bartolomeo Donato
 Cristo (Christ) of Candia II – Giovanni Corner
 Christo Risordo (Risen Christ) of Candia II
 Rodi (Rhodes) of Candia – Francesco Molini (Konstam gives Kodus)
 Sant'Eufemia (St. Euphemia) of Brescia – Orazio Fisogni
 Bravo (Skillful) of Candia – Michele Viramano (Konstam gives Blessed)
 Cavallo Marino (Seahorse) of Venice
 Cristo (Christ) of Candia III – Danielo Calefatti
 Braccio (Arm) of Venice – Nicolò Lippomano (Konstam gives "of Candia")
 Nostra Signora (Our Lady) of Zante – Nicolò Mondini
 Christo Risordo (Risen Christ) of Candia III – Giorgio Calergi
 Nostra Signora (Our Lady) of Venice I – Marcantonio Pisani
 Dio Padre e Santa Trinità (God, Father & Holy Trinity) of Venice – Giovanni Marino Contarini †
 Cristo Risorto (Risen Christ) of Venice III – Giovanni Battista Querini
 Angelo (Angel) of Venice – Onfre Giustiniani
 Santa Dorotea (St. Dorothy) of Venice – Polo Nani
 Ketianana of Retimo – Nicolò Avonal
 Lion's Head of Istria
 Croce (Cross) of Cefalonia – Marco Cimera
 Vergine Santa (Virgin Saint) of Cefalonia – Cristoforo Criffa
 Cristo Risorto (Risen Christ) of Veglia – Lodovico Cicuta (Konstam gives "of Vegia")
 San Nicolò (St. Nicholas) of Cherso – Colane Drascio
 Some sources include:
 Dama a cavallo (Lady on Horseback) of Candia – Antonio Eudomeniani
 Leone (Lion) of Capodistria – Domenico Del Taco
 Spanish Galleys (12)
 Lomellina of Naples – Agostino Cancuale (Konstam gives "of Spain")
 Fiamma (Flame) of Naples – Juan de las Cuevas
 San Giovanni (St. John) of Naples – Garcia de Vergara
 Invidia (Envy) of Naples – Teribio de Accaves
 Brava (Skillful) of Naples – Miguel Quesada (Konstam gives Blessed)
 San Jacopo (St. James) of Naples – Moferat Guardiola
 San Nicola (St. Nicholas) of Naples – Cristobal de Mongiu (Konstam gives San Nicolò)
 Vittoria (Victory) of Naples – Occava of Rocadi
 Fortuna (Fortune) of Gio Andrea Doria – Giovanni Alvigi Belvi (Konstam gives "of St. Andrew")
 3 other unnamed galleys, given by some sources as:
 Sagittaria (Archer) of Naples – Martino Pirola
 Idra (Hydra) of Naples – Luigi Pasqualigo
 Santa Lucia (St. Lucy) of Naples – Francesco Bono
 Papal Galley (1)
 Regina (Queen) – Fabio Valicati (Konstam gives Reign)
 Genoese Galley (1)
 Marchesa (Marquise) of Gio Andrea Doria – Francesco San Fedra (Konstam gives Marchessa)

Center Division

Commanded by Don John of Austria (62 galleys, 2 galleasses)
 Venetian Galleasses (2)
 Galleass of Jacopo Guoro
 Galleass of Francesco Duodo
 Spanish Galleys (15)
 Real (royal flagship) – Don John of Austria, admiral of the navy
 Capitana (flagship) of Castille – Luis de Requesens
 Capitana (flagship) of Savoy – Andrea Provana of Leinì (Konstam gives Prince of Urbino, admiral of Savoy)
 Patrona Real (royal squadron flagship) (Spain) – Juan Bautista Cortés or Luis de Requesens
 Capitana (flagship) of Bandinelli (Naples) – Bandinelli Sauli (Konstam gives Bandinella & Bendinelli)
 Capitana (flagship) of Grimaldi (Naples) – Giorgio Grimaldi
 Padrona (squadron flagship) of Spain – Francesco de Benavides (Konstam gives Bonavides)
 Roccaful of Spain – Roccaful (Konstam gives Fortress)
 San Francisco (St. Francis) of Spain
 Granada of Spain – Paolo Bottino (Konstam gives Granata)
 Figiera of Spain – Diego Lopez de Ilianos
 Luna (Moon) of Spain – Manuel de Aguilar
 Fortuna (Fortune) of Naples
 Mendoza of Naples – Álvaro de Bazán (Konstam gives Mendozza)
 San Giorgio (St. George) of Naples – Eugenio de Vargas
 Another unnamed galley, given by some sources as:
 Piramide con cane (Pyramid & Dog) of Spain (?) – Marcantonio Uliana

 Venetian Galleys (29)
 Capitana (flagship) of Venice (L) – Sebastiano Venier, Captain-General of the Sea
 Capitana (flagship) of Lomellini – Paolo Orsini
 Padrona (squadron flagship) of Lomellini – Pier Battista Lomellini
 Capitana (flagship) of Mari – Giorgio d'Asti
 San Giovanni (St. John) of Venice I – Pietro Badoaro
 Tronco (Trunk) of Venice – Girolamo Canale
 Mongibello (Mt. Gibel) of Venice – Bertucci Contarini
 Vergine (Virgin) of Candia
 Nostra Signora (Our Lady) of Venice II – Giovanni Zeni
 Cristo (Christ) of Venice II – Girolamo Contarini
 Ruota con Serpente (Wheel & Serpent) – Gabrio da Canale
 Piramide (Pyramid) of Venice
 Palma (Palm) of Venice – Girolamo Venier †
 San Teodoro (St. Theodore) of Venice – Teodoro Balbi
 Montagna (Mountain) of Candia – Alessandro Vizzamano
 San Giovanni Battista (St. John the Baptist) of Venice – Giovanni Mocenigo
 Cristo (Christ) of Venice III – Giorgio Pisani
 San Giovanni (St. John) of Venice II – Daniele Moro
 Passaro (Sparrow) of Venice – Nicolò Tiepolo
 Leone (Lion) of Venice – Pietro Pisani
 San Girolamo (St. Jerome) of Venice – Gasparo Malipiero
 Giuditta (Judith) of Zante – Marino Sicuro
 San Cristoforo (St. Christopher) of Venice – Alessandro Contarini
 Armellino (Ermine) of Candia – Marco Quirini (Konstam gives Armelino)
 Mezza Luna (Half Moon) of Venice – Valerio Valleresso
 Uomo di Mare (Man of the Sea) of Vicenza – Jacopo Draffano
 Sant'Alessandro (St. Alexander) of Bergamo – Giovanni Antonio Colleoni
 San Girolamo (St. Jerome) of Hvar – Giovanni Balsi
 Another unnamed Venetian galley
 Genoese Galleys (8)
 Capitana (flagship) of Genoa (L) – Ettore Spinola †
 Capitana (flagship) of Gil d'Andrada (L) – Bernardo Cinoguera
 Padrona (squadron flagship) of Genoa (L) – Pellerano
 Padrona Imperiale (squadron flagship) of Davide Imperiali (Sicily) – Nicolò da Luvano
 Perla (Pearl) of Gio Andrea Doria – Giovanni Battista Spinola
 Temperanza (Temperance) of Gio Andrea Doria  – Cipriano De Mari
 Vittoria (Victory) of Gio Andrea Doria – Filippo Doria
 Doria of Gio Andrea Doria – Jacopo of Casale (Konstam gives Piramide, Pyramid)
 Papal Galleys (6) (including Tuscan contingent)
 Capitana (flagship) of His Holiness – Marcantonio Colonna, flagship of the papal contingent
 Toscana (Tuscany) of Tuscany – Metello Caracciolo
 Pisana (Pisa) of Tuscany – Ercole Lotta
 Firenze (Florence) of Tuscany – Tommaso De' Medici
 Pace (Peace) of His Holiness – Jacopo Antonio Perpignano
 Vittoria (Victoria) of His Holiness – Baccio of Pisa
 Some sources also include
 Grifona (Gryphon) of His Holiness – Alessandro Negrone
 Galleys of the Knights of Malta (3)
 Capitana (flagship) of Malta – Pietro Giustiniani, prior of Messina; flagship of the Maltese contingent (Konstam gives "Justin, the Prior of Messina")
 San Pietro (St. Peter) – Roquelare St.-Aubin (Konstam gives The Order of St. Peter)
 San Giovanni (St. John) – Alonso de Texada (Konstam gives The Order of St. John)

Right Wing

Commanded by Giovanni Andrea Doria (53 galleys, 2 galleasses)
 Venetian Galleasses (2)
 Galleass of Andrea da Cesare
 Galleass of Pietro Pisani
 Genoese Galleys (16)
 Capitana (flagship) of Giovanni Andrea Doria – Giovanni Andrea Doria
 Capitana (flagship) of Negroni – Gio Ambrogio Negroni
 Padrona (squadron flagship) of Grimaldi – Lorenzo Treccia (Konstam gives "Trecha")
 Padrona (squadron flagship) of Nicolò Doria – Giulio Centurione (Konstam gives "of Andrea Doria")
 Padrona (squadron flagship) of Negroni – Luigi Gamba
 Padrona (squadron flagship) of Lomellini – Giorgio Greco
 Swordsman of Rethymno/Retimo
 San Vittorio (St. Victor) of Crema
 Furia (Fury) of Lomellini – Jacopo Chiappe
 Negrona (Negress) of Negroni – Nicolo da Costa
 Bastarda (Bastard) of Negroni – Lorenzo da Torre
 San Tritone of Cataro
 Monarca (Monarch) of Gio Andrea Doria – Nicolò Garibaldo
 Donzella (Maid) of Gio Andrea Doria – Nicolò Imperiale
 Diana of Genoa – Giovanni Giorgio Lasagna
 Another unnamed Genoese galley, given by some sources as
 Urania of Genoa
 Other sources include
 Capitana (flagship) of Nicolò Doria – Pandolfo Polidoro
 Padrona (squadron flagship) of Mari – Antonio Corniglia
 Spanish Galleys (10)
 Sicilia (Sicily) – Francesco Amodei
 Piemontese (Savoyard) – Ottavio Moretto †
 Margherita (Margaret) – Battaglino
 Cingana – Gabriel de Medina
 Luna (Moon) – Julio Rubio
 Speranza (Hope) – Pedro de Busto
 Gusmana – Francesco de Osedo
 3 other unnamed galleys, given by some sources as
 Fortuna (Fortuna) – Diego de Medrano
 Determinada (Determined) – Juan de Angustina Carasa
 Turca (Turk) – Simone Goto
 Venetian Galleys (25)
 Padrona (squadron flagship) of Mari (Parini) – Antonio Corriglia
 Forza (Force) of Venice – Rinieri Zeni
 Regina (Queen) of Candia – Giovanni Barbarigo (Konstam gives Rema)
 Nino (Boy) of Venice – Paulo Polani
 Cristo Risorto (Risen Christ) of Venice IV – Benedetto Soranzo
 Palma (Palm) of Candia – Jacopo di Mezzo †
 Angelo (Angel) of Corfu – Stelio Carchiopulo
 Nave (Ship) of Venice – Antonio Pasqualigo
 Nostra Signora (Our Lady) of Candia – Marco Foscarini
 Cristo (Our Lady) of Candia IV – Francesco Cornero
 Fuoco (Flame) of Candia – Antonio Boni
 Aquila (Eagle) of Candia – Girolamo Zorzi
 San Cristoforo (St. Christopher) of Venice – Andrea Tron
 Cristo (Christ) of Venice IV – Marcantonio Lando †
 Speranza (Hope) of Candia – Girolamo Cornaro †
 San Giuseppe (St. Joseph) of Venice – Nicolò Donato
 Torre (Tower) of Vicenza – Lodovico da Porto
 Aquila (Eagle) of Corfu – Pietro Bua †
 Aquila (Eagle) of Retimo  – Pietro Pisano
 San Giovanni (St. John) of Arbe – Giovanni de Dominis
 La Donna (The Lady) of Friuli/Traù – Luigi Cipoco
 Re Attila (King Attila) of Padua – Pataro Buzzacarini (Konstam gives Reality)
 3 other unnamed galleys, given by some sources as
 Uomo Armato (Armed Man) of Retimo – Andrea Calergi, signore of Candia
 San Vittorio (St. Victor) of Crema – Evangelista Zurla
 San Trifone (St. Tryphon) of Cattaro/Kotor – Girolamo Bisante or Bizanti
 Papal Galleys (2)
 Santa Maria (St. Mary) of His Holiness – Pandolfo Strozzi
 San Giovanni (St. John) of His Holiness – Angelo (or Antonio) Bifali

Rearguard

Commanded by Don Álvaro de Bazán (38 galleys, including 8 galleys of the Advance Guard)
 Spanish Galleys (13)
 Lupa (Wolf) (flagship) – Don Alvaro de Bazan, Marchese of Santa Cruz
 Capitana (flagship) of Vasquez (Spain) – Juan Vasquez de Coronado
 San Giovanni (St. John) of Sicily – David Imperiale
 Gru (Crane) of Spain – Luis Heredia
 Leona (Lioness) of Spain (Konstam gives Leona)
 Costanza of Naples – Pietro Delagia
 Marchesa (Marquise) of Spain – Juan de Machado †
 Santa Barbara (St. Barbara) of Naples – Giovanni de Ascale
 Sant'Andrea (St. Andrew) of Naples
 Santa Caterina (St. Catherine) of Naples – Juan Rufis de Velasco
 Sant'Angelo of Naples
 Terana of Naples – Giovanni de Riva of Neillino
 Another unnamed Spanish or Neapolitan galley, given by some sources as
 Ocasión (Occasion) of Spain – Pedro de Roig
 Venetian Galleys (12)
 Cristo (Christ) of Venice V – Marco da Molino
 Due Mani (Two Hands) of Venice – Giovanni Loredano †
 Fede (Faith) of Venice – Giovanni Battista Contarini
 Pilastro (Pillar) of Venice – Caterino Malipiero
 Maddalena (Magdalene) of Venice – Alvigi Balbe
 Signora (Lady) of Venice – Giovanni Bembo
 Mondo (World) of Venice – Filippo Leoni
 Speranza (Hope) of Cipro – Giovanni Battista Benedetti † (Konstam gives "of Venice")
 San Pietro (St. Peter) – Marco Fiumaco
 Sibilla (Sibyl) of Venice – Danielo Troni
 San Giorgio (St. George) of Sebenico – Cristoforo Lucio
 San Michele (St. Michael) – Giorgio Cochini
 Papal Galleys (3)
 Padrona (squadron flagship) of His Holiness – Alfonso d'Appiano
 Suprema (Supremacy) – Antonio da Ascoli
 Serena (Serenity)
 Genoese Galleys (2)
 Baccana – Giovanni Pietro de Morilo
 Another unnamed Genoese galley, given by some sources as
 San Bartolomeo (St. Bartholomew)

Vanguard
Commanded by Juan de Cardona (8 galleys attached to the Reserve force)
 Capitana (flagship) of Sicilia – Giovanni Antonio de Cardona
 Padrona (squadron flagship) of Sicily
 San Giovanni (St. John) of Sicily – Davide Imperiale
 San Ionica of Sicily
 Santa Maddalena (St. Magdalene) of Venice – Marino Contarini
 Sole (Sun) of Venice – Vincenzo Quirini †
 Santa Caterina (St. Catherine) of Venice – Marco Cicogna
 Nostra Donna (Our Lady) of Venice – Pier Francesco Malipiero (Konstam gives "Our Woman")

Ottoman Fleet²
Supreme command of the Ottoman Fleet was held by Müezzinzade Ali Pasha

Left Wing

Commanded by Uluç Ali Reis (61 galleys, 32 galliots)
 Turkish (Constantinople) Galleys (14)
 Nasur Ferhad
 Kasam Reis
 Osman Reis
 Kiafi Hajji
 Ferhad Ali
 Memi Bey
 Piri Osman
 Piri Reis
 Selim Basti
 Talatagi Reis
 Celebi Reis
 Tartar Ali
 Kafir Hajji
 Karaman Pasha
 Barbary (Algerian) Galleys (14)
 Uluç Ali Reis – Wing commander
 Karl Ali
 Karaman Ali
 Alemdar Pasha
 Sinian Celebi
 Amdjazade Mustafa
 Dragud Ali
 Seydi Ali
 Peri Selim
 Murad Darius
 Uluj Reis
 Macasir Ali
 Ionas Osman
 Salim Deli
 Syrian Galleys (6)
 Kara Bey
 Dermat Bey
 Osman Bey
 Iusuf Ali
 Kari Alemdar
 Murad Hasan
 Anatolian Galleys (13)
 Karali Reis
 Piriman Reis
 Hazuli Sinian
 Chios Mehemet
 Hignau Mustafa
 Cademly Mustafa
 Uschiufly Memy
 Kari Mora
 Darius Pasha
 Piali Osman
 Tursun Osman
 Iosul Piali
 Keduk Seydi
 Greek (Negropont) Galleys (14)
 Seydi Reis
 Arnaud Ali
 Chendereli Mustafa
 Mustafa Hajji
 Sali Reis
 Hamid Ali
 Karaman Hyder
 Magyar Fehrad
 Nasur Ferhad
 Nasi Reis
 Kara Rhodi
 Kos Hajji
 Kos Mend
 Karam Bey (Albanian)
 Turkish (Constantinople) Galliots (19)
 Uluj Piri Pasha
 Karaman Suleiman
 Haneshi Ahmed
 Hyder Enver
 Nur Memi
 Karaman Reis
 Kaleman Memi
 Guzman Ferhad
 Hunyadis Hasan
 Kemal Murad
 Sarmusal Reis
 Tursun Suleiman
 Celebi Iusuf
 Hascedi Hassan
 Sian Memi
 Osman Dagli
 Karaman Reis
 2 unnamed Turkish galiots
 Albanian Galiots (8)
 Deli Murad
 Alemdar Reis
 Sian Siander
 Alemrdar Ali
 Hasan Omar
 Seydi Aga
 Hasan Sinam
 Jami Fazil
 Anatolian Galiots (5)
 Kara Alemdhar
 Suzi Memi
 Nabi Reis
 Hasan Osman
 Hunyadi Iusuf

Centre Division

Commanded by Müezzinzade Ali Pasha (87 galleys divided into the First Line (among which are the fittest and newest galleys of the fleet) and the Second Line)

First Line
 Turkish (Constantinople) Galleys (22)
 Müezzinzade Ali Pasha, Sultana – Fleet flagship
 Osman Reis – Wing commander
 Portasi Pasha – Commander, embarked troops
 Hasan Pasha (son of Barbarossa)
 Hasan Reis
 Kos Ali
 Kilik Reais
 Uluj Reis
 Piri Uluj Bey
 Dardagan Reis – Governor of the Arsenal
 Deli Osman
 Piri Osman
 Demir Celebi
 Darius Haseki
 Sinian Mustafa
 Heseki Reis
 Hasan Uluj
 Kosem Iusuf
 Aga Ahmed
 Osman Seydi
 Darius Celebi
 Kafar Reis
 Rhodes Galleys (12)
 Hasan Rey – Governor of Rhodes (L)
 Deli Chender – Warden of Rhodes (L)
 Osa Reis
 Postana Uluj
 Khalifa Uluj
 Ghazni Reis
 Dromus Reis
 Berber Kali
 Karagi Reis
 Occan Reis
 Deli Ali
 Hajji Aga
 Black Sea (Bulgarian and Bithynian) Galleys (13)
 Prauil Aga
 Kara Reis
 Arnaud Reis
 Jami Uluj
 Arnaud Celebi
 Magyar Ali
 Kali Celebi
 Deli Celebi
 Deli Assan
 Kamen Aga
 Sinian Reis
 Kari Mustafa
 Seydi Arnaud
 Gallipoli Galleys (4)
 Piri Hamagi
 Ali Reis
 Iusuf Ali
 Sinian Bektashi
 Greek (Negropont) Galleys (11)
 Osman Reis
 Mehmed Bey – Governor of Metelina
 Baktashi Uluj
 Baktashi Mustafa
 Sinian Ali
 Agdagi Reis
 Deli Iusuf
 Orphan Ali
 Cali Celebi
 Bagdar Reis
 Hanyadi Mustafa

Second Line
 Constantinople Galleys (12)
 Tramontana Reis
 Murad Reis
 Suleiman Celebi
 Deli Ibrahim
 Murad Korosi
 Darnad Ali
 Kari Reis
 Darius Sinian
 Dardagi Ali
 Hyder Carai
 Darius Ali
 Kan Ali
 Barbary (Tripoli) Galleys (6)
 Hyder Aga
 Kari Hamat
 Husam Kahlim Ali
 Deram Uluj
 Deydi Ali
 Mohammed Ali
 Gallipoli Galleys (7)
 Aziz Khalifa – Governor of Gallipoli
 Selim Sahi
 Seydi Pasha
 Hasan Mustafa
 Hasseri Ali
 Hassan Deli
 Iusuf Seydi

Right Wing
Commanded by Mehmed Siroco (60 galleys and 2 galiots)
 Turkish (Constantinople) Galleys (20)
 Suleiman Bey
 Kara Mustafa
 Ibrahim Reis
 Suleiman Reis
 Karaman Ibrahim
 Chender Sinian
 Hasan Nabi
 Ali 'Genoese'
 Hali Reis
 Seydi Selim
 Kumar Iusuf
 Bardas Celebi
 Bardas Hasan
 Fazil Ali Bey
 Drusari Piri
 Koda Ali
 Sinaman Mustafa
 Caracoza Ali
 Mustafa Alendi
 Marmara Reis
 Babary (Tripoli) Galleys (5)
 Arga Pasha
 Arnaut Ferhad
 Darnad Iusuf
 Suleiman Reis
 Fazil Memi
 Anatolian Galleys (13)
 Mehemet Bey
 Maysor Ali
 Amurat Reis
 Kalifi Memi
 Murad Mustafa
 Hyder Mehmet
 Sinian Darius
 Mehmet Darius
 Amdjazade Simian
 Adagi Hasan
 Sinjji Musafa
 Hajji Cebebi
 Tursan Mustafa
 Egyptian (Alexandrian) Galleys (22)
 Mehmed Siroco (wing commander)
 Kari Ali
 Herus Reis
 Karas Turbat
 Bagli Serif
 Hasan Celebi
 Osman Celebi
 Dink Kasai
 Osman Occan
 Darius Aga
 Drazed Sinian
 Osman Ali
 Deli Aga
 Dardagut Bardabey
 Kasli Khan
 Iusuf Aga
 Iusuf Magyar
 Khalifa Hyder
 Mustafa Kemal
 Dernadi Piri
 Memi Hasan
 Kari Ali
 Egyptian (Alexandrian) Galiots (2)
 Abdul Reis
 Piali Murad

Rearguard
Commanded by Amuret Dragut Rais (8 galleys and 22 galiots)
 Greek (Negropont) Galleys (4)
 Amuret Dragut Reis
 Kaidar Memi
 Deli Dori
 Hasan Sinian
 Anatolian Galleys (4)
 Deli Suleiman
 Deli Bey
 Kiafar Bey
 Kasim Sinian
 Mixed Squadron of Galiots (22)
 Ali Uluj
 Kara Deli
 Ferhad Kara Ali
 Dardagud Reis
 Kasim Kara
 Hasan Reis
 Alemdar Hasan
 Kos Ali
 Hajji Ali
 Kurtprulu Celebi
 Setagi Meni
 Setagi Osman
 Hyder Ali
 Hyder Deli
 Armad Memi
 Hasan Reis
 Jami Naser
 Nur Ali
 Kari Ali
 Murad Ali
 Iumaz Ali
 Haneschi Murad

Notes on ship nomenclature
1. Several vessels among the fleet of the Holy League bore the same name. Whilst this is not unheard of among ships belonging to different nationalities, some of the said ships belong to the same nation. These did not seem to be of great importance to Christian commanders at that time. In order to avoid confusion, those vessels bearing the same name were suffixed with ordinal number according to nationality (i.e. Christ of Candia I, Christ of Candia II; Christ of Venice I, Christ of Venice II, etc.).

2. In contrast to their Western contemporaries, Turkish records only show the names of commanders of the ships instead of the names of the ship themselves.

3. In Italian use, various flagships were called by the rank of their commander. A reale ("royal") was personally commanded by a king or his agent; a capitana ("captainess") by a captain general; a padrona ("master") by a padrone.

References

 
 
 
 

Orders of battle
Battle of Lepanto